Venom vs. Carnage is a comic book limited series written by Peter Milligan with art by Clayton Crain published by Marvel Comics. It has a total of four issues and has been reprinted in trade paperback form under the title Spider-Man: Venom vs. Carnage. It features the first appearance of the Toxin symbiote.

Collected edition
All four issues were collected in the 96-page softcover trade paperback Spider-Man: Venom vs. Carnage.

References

Superhero comics
Marvel Comics limited series
Spider-Man titles
2004 comics debuts
2004 comics endings